Benjamin Green Freeman was a Liberian politician. He was the Liberian ambassador to Senegal, Zaire and Cote d'Ivoire. He was Speaker of the House of Representatives of Liberia from 1943 to 1951.

References

Year of birth missing
Year of death missing
Speakers of the House of Representatives of Liberia
Ambassadors of Liberia to Senegal
Ambassadors of Liberia to the Democratic Republic of the Congo
Ambassadors of Liberia to Ivory Coast
Place of birth missing